Thomas Miles may refer to:
 Thomas J. Miles, legal professor and dean of the University of Chicago Law School
 Thomas O. Miles (1789–1858), Canadian politician
 Thomas Miles (entertainer), American comedian also known by the stage name Nephew Tommy
 Thomas Richard Miles (1923–2008), British professor of psychology at Bangor University
 Thomas Miles (Canadian football) (born 1992), Canadian football linebacker
 Tom Miles (athlete) (1905–1961), Australian sprinter
 Tom Miles (politician) (born 1979), member of the Mississippi House of Representatives

See also
Miles Thomas (1897–1980), Welsh businessman
Thomas Myles (1857–1937), Irish Home Ruler and surgeon